Sindoor Tere Naam Ka is an Indian television series that aired on Zee TV at 7:30pm from 21 March 2005 to 6 April 2007 completing 521 episodes.

Plot
The story is based on the lives of two sisters, Niharika (Keerti Gaekwad Kelkar) and Vedika (Gurdeep Kohli). Vedika is a mentally unstable young woman who fears the traditional sindoor. Vedika's sister, Niharika, agrees to marry a disabled man named Antariksh (Pracheen Chauhan) on the condition that Vedika marry his younger brother. She marries a sane man named Dhruv (Sachin Shroff). The subsequent events in their lives, along with the fortunes of their family members, form the crux of the story.

Cast
 Gurdeep Kohli as Vedika Dhruv Raizada (née Agarwal)
 Aashka Goradia as Arpita Kunal Rathore / Arpita Dhruv Raizada (nee Prasad)
 Keerti Gaekwad Kelkar as Niharika Antariksh Raizada / Niharika Rudra Raizada / Niharika Shivam Kapoor (née Agarwal)
 Pracheen Chauhan as Antariksh Raizada
 Sachin Shroff as 
 Dhruv Raizada 
 Karan Raizada (Oberoi) (2006)
 Tanvi Azmi / Kiran Juneja as Kavita Virendra Raizada
 Sharad Kelkar as Rudra Raizada
 Naresh Suri as Virendra Raizada
 Shweta Gautam as Tara Raizada / Tara Rahul Malhotra 
 Kishori Shahane as Uma Agarwal, Niharika and Vedika's mother
 Jayati Bhatia as Titli, Rajan's wife
 Gulrez Khan as Advocate Aarti Sabharwal / Aarti Dhruv Raizada
 Tanushree Kaushal as Bulbul, Titli's elder sister
 Rohit Bakshi as Suraj, Vedika's ex-boyfriend
 Sachin Sharma as Shivam Kapoor, Niharika's third husband
 Gunn Kansara as Kajal Antariksh Raizada
 Gunjan Walia as Naina Kothari, Kajal's younger sister = Antagonist 
 Aanchal Anand as Alisha, Karan's girlfriend = Antagonist 
 Anand Suryavanshi as Rahul Malhotra, Niharika's ex-boyfriend
 Faraaz Khan as Dr. Shantanu Sengupta
 Sumukhi Pendse as Sundari, Antariksh's biological mother
 Kapil Soni as Police Inspector 
 Dinesh Mehta as Police Inspector 
 Iqbal Azad as Rajan, Kavita's brother
 Vineet Raina as Titli Mami's son
 Rahul Lohani as Kunal Rathore, Arpita's ex-husband
 Sulabha Arya as Sumitra Rathore
 Shashi Kiran as Pandit Bhavani Prasad
 Swati Anand as Urvashi Oberoi, Kavita's younger sister
 Usha Bachani as Pamela Singhania
 Kanika Maheshwari as Sneha
 Garima Kapoor as Nandita Kapoor, Shivam's younger sister
 Diwakar Pundir as Ayushmaan Malhotra
 Gulfam Khan as Firdaus
 Pratima Kazmi as Savita
 Swati Chitnis as Shalini Malhotra
 Unknown  as Sudeepa Sengupta
 Unknown as Angoori (Virendra's elder cousin sister)
 Naveen Saini as Shekhar, Sneha's boyfriend 
 Prashant Bhatt
 Amardeep Jha as Chitralekha

References

External links
Official Site
 

2005 Indian television series debuts
2007 Indian television series endings
Indian television soap operas
Zee TV original programming